The 1924 New Mexico Lobos football team represented the University of New Mexico as an independent during the 1924 college football season. In their fifth season under head coach Roy W. Johnson, the Lobos compiled a 5–1 record. Kenneth Grueter was the team captain.

In its 56-0 victory in the season opener, the team did not allow a first down Montezuma College. This remains the only game in school history in which a New Mexico team has not allowed a first down.

Schedule

References

New Mexico
New Mexico Lobos football seasons
New Mexico Lobos football